The Plantem is a Nimbin street theatre character created by former Nimbin, New South Wales resident Bob Hopkins, modelled on Lee Falk's Phantom comic book character. The Plantem campaigns against prohibition and joins in the festivities of the Nimbin MardiGrass Cannabis Law Reform Rally. 

Since Bob vacated the position, the Plantem was portrayed by another local Nimbin fellow John Taylor, also known by the curious name of "Chicken" George. George died in December 2007

Sources

External links
 http://www.nimbinmardigrass.com/Plantem_II.html

Culture of New South Wales
Fictional Australian people